Karam is an Indian soap opera created by Swapna Waghmare Joshi and co-produced by Ekta Kapoor and Shobha Kapoor under their banner Balaji Telefilms. The series was premiered in 2001 on SAB TV.

Plot
The series revolves around two fictional families, the Rais and the Zaveris. The series explores how the protagonist Manasi Zaveri (Mouli Ganguly) marries an affluent businessman Jay Rai (Yash Tonk) who faces marital rape. The series further explores how Manasi is caught in a dilemma of whether to walk out of the marriage and face the wrath of society or to stay in marriage with the man who abused her very existence as a woman.

Cast 
 Yash Tonk as Jay Rai
 Mouli Ganguly as Manasi Zaveri / Manasi Jay Rai
 Rita Bhaduri as Mrs.  Zaveri, Manasi's mother
 Nitin Trivedi as Mr. Rai, Jay's father
 Nayan Bhatt as Mrs. Rai, Jay's mother
 Shweta Tiwari as Kajal
 Lily Patel as Mrs. Rai, Jay's grandmother
 Mukesh Rawal as Mr. Zaveri, Manasi's father
 Urvashi Dholakia
 Manoj Pandey as Mr. Rai, Jay's elder brother
 Mahesh Pandey
 Shivani Gosain
 Shweta Gautam

References

External links 
 
 Official website

Balaji Telefilms television series
2001 Indian television series debuts
2001 Indian television series endings
Sony SAB original programming
Indian television soap operas